Ešref Jašarević (born 5 February 1951) is a Bosnian retired footballer.

Club career
Born in Gradačac, SR Bosnia-Herzegovina, FPR Yugoslavia, he started playing with local side NK Zvijezda Gradačac, but he would become famous while playing in the Yugoslav First League club FK Sloboda Tuzla where he played a total of 172 first league matches, and scored 13 goals. In 1979, he spent half a season in Turkey with Galatasaray SK, before returning to Yugoslav First League, this time, to FK Napredak Kruševac where he played until 1982.

International career
In 1977, he played two matches for the Yugoslavia national football team. His debut was on January 30, in Bogota, against Colombia (a 1–0 win), and the other match was played on February 1, in León, against Mexico (a 5–1 win).

After retiring, he became a Sports Director of NK Zvijezda Gradačac.

References

External sources
 Profile at Serbian Federation website.
 

1951 births
Living people
People from Gradačac
Association football midfielders
Yugoslav footballers
Yugoslavia international footballers
NK Zvijezda Gradačac players
FK Sloboda Tuzla players
Galatasaray S.K. footballers
FK Napredak Kruševac players
Yugoslav First League players
Süper Lig players
Yugoslav Second League players
Yugoslav expatriate footballers
Expatriate footballers in Turkey
Yugoslav expatriate sportspeople in Turkey